Elder Place in a street  in Fremantle, Western Australia that primarily runs between the north-west ends of Parry Street and Queen Street, south-west of the Fremantle railway line. At the north-eastern end Elder Place becomes Beach Street; at the south-western end it becomes Phillimore Street. A small cul de sac, also called Elder Place, but not connected to the main street, runs off Phillimore Street, in the direction of Market Street.

The southern side of the street was taken up with a large building known as Elders Wool Store, which was run by Elder, Smith and Company. This building was demolished and replaced by the Woolstores Shopping Centre.

In the late nineteenth century, the street was known as Bay Street.

Intersections

Elder Place (main)

Elder Place (cul-de-sac)

Notes

External links
 

 
Streets in Fremantle